Code Rush is a 2000 documentary following the lives of a group of Netscape engineers in Silicon Valley. It covers Netscape's last year as an independent company, from their announcement of the Mozilla open source project until their acquisition by AOL. It particularly focuses on the last-minute rush to make the Mozilla source code ready for release by the deadline of March 31, 1998, and the impact on the engineers' lives and families as they attempt to save the company from ruin.

After Andy Baio uploaded the documentary to his personal website for the release of Mozilla Firefox 3 in 2009, director David Winton requested it be taken down, pending his decision about future distribution under a free content license. It has since been released under the Creative Commons BY-NC-SA 3.0 US license.

Featured Netscape employees 
 Jim Barksdale, CEO
 Scott Collins
 Tara Hernandez
 Stuart Parmenter, then a 16-year-old open-source volunteer
 Jim Roskind
 Michael Toy, co-author of Rogue
 Jamie Zawinski
 Brendan Eich

References

External links 
 
 
 
 
 
 Interview with David Winton, Director of "Code Rush" Mozilla Documentary

Mozilla
Netscape
Documentary films about business
Documentary films about the Internet
2000 films
Creative Commons-licensed documentary films
Internet documentary films
American documentary films
2000 documentary films
2000s English-language films
2000s American films